Public sale may refer to:

 An occasion when goods or property are sold in an auction
 An occasion when a company makes shares available on a stock exchange
 Public Sale (painting), a 1943 painting by the American artist Andrew Wyeth